Constructive eviction is a term used in the law of real property to describe when a landlord sidesteps the formal, legal eviction process, and instead attempts to force the eviction of the tenant by rendering the property uninhabitable (e.g. changing the locks, or deliberately cutting off the heat/water supply to the property). A tenant who is constructively evicted may terminate the lease and seek damages.

Three conditions must be met for a circumstance to qualify as constructive eviction:
A landlord must substantially interfere with a tenant's use and enjoyment of a rental property through either his actions, or his inaction regarding problems.
A landlord fails to respond or resolve any problems that the tenant has reported to the landlord.
The tenant leaves the premises within a reasonable amount of time after a landlord's failure to resolve a problem.

A tenant who suffers from a constructive eviction can claim all of the legal remedies available to a tenant who was actually told to leave.

See also
Implied warranty of habitability

Property law

References